Mujhe Beta Chahiye ( I want a son) is a 2019 Pakistani family drama television series, produced by Sadia Jabbar under their banner Sadia Jabbar Productions. The drama airs weekly episode on A-Plus TV every Tuesday. It stars Sabreen Hisbani and Shahood Alvi while Aiza Awan played the antagonist.

Plot 
The story focuses on social issues associated with pressure for a wife to produce male offspring.

Cast
 Sabreen Hisbani as Rubina
 Shahood Alvi as Salman
 Aiza Awan as Jahan Ara
 Shagufta Ejaz as Shareefan
 Ismat Iqbal as Bano
 Umar Cheema as Omar
 Talat Shah
 Hina Imran
 Sajid Shah as Sheikh

References

External links
Official website

2019 Pakistani television series debuts
Pakistani television series
Urdu-language television shows
Pakistani drama television series